The following is a list of AFL/VFL individual honours, which have been awarded to players or coaches of the St Kilda Football Club.

Trevor Barker Award

An individual player award under various headings such as "champion player" and later "best and fairest" has been made since about 1914. In the late 1990s the club named the award the Trevor Barker Award to honour the name and memory of Trevor Barker, a former St Kilda player and reserves coach.

The person who has won the most St Kilda best and fairest awards:
 Nick Riewoldt: 2002, 2004, 2006, 2007, 2009, 2014

Brownlow Medal

The Brownlow Medal is awarded to the "best and fairest" player in the Australian Football League (AFL) during the regular season (i.e., not including finals matches) as determined by votes cast by the officiating umpires after each game. It is the most prestigious award for individual players in the AFL.  It is also widely acknowledged as the highest individual honour in the sport of Australian rules football.

 Robert Harvey, 1997 and 1998
 Tony Lockett, 1987
 Ian Stewart, 1965 and 1966
 Ross Smith, 1967
 Verdun Howell, 1959
 Neil Roberts, 1958
 Brian Gleeson, 1957
 Colin Watson, 1925

Norm Smith Medal

 Lenny Hayes, 2010 (first Grand Final)

Michael Tuck Medal

Since 1992, the Michael Tuck Medal has been awarded to the player adjudged best on ground during the AFL Cup Final held before the Premiership season begins each year. Three St Kilda Football Club players have won it.

 Jason Gram: 2008
 Robert Harvey: 2004
 Nicky Winmar: 1996

Leigh Matthews Trophy

The Leigh Matthews Trophy is awarded by the AFL Players Association to the player voted the most valuable during the year, the award has been given out ever since Leigh Matthews first won it in 1982.

 Nick Riewoldt, 2004
 Robert Harvey, 1997
 Tony Lockett, 1987

Coleman Medal

The Coleman Medal is awarded to the leading goal scorer in the league in the home and away season.  Prior to 1955 the league's leading goal scorer was awarded the Leading Goalkicker Medal.

 Fraser Gehrig, 2004 and 2005
 Tony Lockett, 1987 and 1991
 Bill Young, 1956
 Bill Mohr, 1936
 Charlie Baker, 1902

AFL Rising Star

The AFL Rising Star award is given to a young player considered to have significantly improved during the year. Every round, an Australian Football League rising star nomination is given to a standout young player. To be eligible for the award, a player must be under 21 on 1 January of that year, have played 10 or fewer senior games before the beginning of the season, and not have been suspended during the season.

 Nick Riewoldt, 2002
 Justin Koschitzke, 2001

Australian Football Hall of Fame

The Australian Football Hall of Fame was established in 1996, the centenary year of the Australian Football League, to help recognise the contributions made to the sport of Australian rules football by players, umpires, media personalities, coaches and administrators. As of 2015, the following sixteen former players and coaches who served at least part of their career at St Kilda have been inducted into the AFL's Hall of Fame, with five players elevated to the top status of 'Legend', reserved for approximately 10% of the total Hall of Fame.

 Darrel Baldock, legend
 Roy Cazaly, legend
 Alex Jesaulenko, legend
 Tony Lockett, legend
 Ian Stewart, legend
 Vic Cumberland
 Carl Ditterich
 Wels Eicke
 Les Foote
 Robert Harvey
 Allan Jeans (inducted as coach)
 Dave McNamara
 Bill Mohr
 Neil Roberts
 Ross Smith
 Colin Watson

References

Individual honours
Australian rules football-related lists